was a feudal domain under the Tokugawa shogunate of Edo period Japan, located in Harima Province in what is now the southwestern portion of modern-day Hyōgo Prefecture. It was centered around the Anji jin'ya which was located in what is now the city of Himeji, Hyōgo and was controlled by a cadet branch fudai daimyō Ogasawara clan throughout all of its history.

History
In 1716, the 5th daimyō of Nakatsu Domain in Buzen Province, Ogasawara Nakasato died at the age of five. As he had no heir, this would normally be cause for attainder; however, in recognition of the death in combat of one his ancestors at the Siege of Osaka, the Tokugawa shogunate decided to appoint his uncle, Ogasawara Nagaoki as daimyō, but to reduce his kokudaka to 10,000 koku and to relocate his seat to Anji. Ogasawara Nagaoki was weak health and retired at the age of 19 without heir, but he adopted the son of Ogasawara Tadamoto of Kokura Domain, Ogasawara Nagamitsu, as his successor. Afterwards, the domain was regarded as if it was a subordinate domain of Kokura. Due to these strong ties, the domain fought in the Chōshū expeditions against Chōshū Domain, bu with the start of the Boshin War defected to the Imperial side. In 1871, with the abolition of the han system, the domain became Anji Prefecture, which was merged with Shikama Prefecture, which in turn became part of Hyōgo Prefecture.

The clan was ennobled with the kazoku peerage title of shishaku (viscount) in 1884.

Holdings at the end of the Edo period
As with most domains in the han system, Anji Domain consisted of several discontinuous territories calculated to provide the assigned kokudaka, based on periodic cadastral surveys and projected agricultural yields. 

Harima Province 
18 villages in Ako District
11 villages in Sayo District
18 villages in Shisō District

List of daimyō 

{| class=wikitable
! #||Name || Tenure || Courtesy title || Court Rank || kokudaka 
|-
|colspan=6|  Ogasawara clan, 1716-1871 (Fudai)
|-
||1||||1716 - 1730|| -none- || -none- ||10,000 koku
|-
||2||||1730 - 1770||Shinano-no-kami (信濃守)|| Junior 5th Rank, Lower Grade (従五位下)||10,000 koku
|-
||3||||1770 - 1782||Shinano-no-kami (信濃守)|| Junior 5th Rank, Lower Grade (従五位下)||10,000 koku
|-
||4||||1782 - 1823||Shinano-no-kami (信濃守)|| Junior 5th Rank, Lower Grade (従五位下)||10,000 koku
|-
||5||||1823 - 1832||Shinano-no-kami (信濃守)|| Junior 5th Rank, Lower Grade (従五位下)||10,000 koku
|-
||6||||1832 - 1860||Shinano-no-kami (信濃守)|| Junior 5th Rank, Lower Grade (従五位下)||10,000 koku
|-
||7||||1860 - 1871||Shinano-no-kami (信濃守)|| Junior 5th Rank, Lower Grade (従五位下)||10,000 koku
|-
|}

See also 
 List of Han
 Abolition of the han system

Further reading
 Bolitho, Harold. (1974). Treasures Among Men: The Fudai Daimyo in Tokugawa Japan. New Haven: Yale University Press.  ;  OCLC 185685588

References

Domains of Japan
1871 disestablishments in Japan
States and territories disestablished in 1871
Harima Province
History of Hyōgo Prefecture